Bhavan's Lloyds Vidya Niketan (or BLVN) is a private secondary school in Bhugaon, Wardha, India, established in 1995. It is an English medium CBSE school.

History
The school was started for the children of the employees of Lloyds Steel Industry. In 1995, it was run in the residential colony and had classes till class IV. It moved to the current location in 1996 when the classes were expanded to class IX. Class X was added the next year. Class XI and XII were added around 2004 but were soon scrapped due to poor response. They were restarted in 2009.

Organisation
The institute comprises three wings - primary, secondary and higher. The primary wing consists of classes from LKG to Std. IV. The secondary wing consists of classes from Std. V to Std. VIII. A new building was constructed for higher class which has classes from IX to XII. It has two fields – science and commerce. The school has a playground which has fields for football, cricket, basketball, handball, volleyball and for junior recreational facilities. The school also has excellent lab facilities including biology lab, physics lab, chemistry lab, social science lab and also a math lab.

External links
 Official website
http://www.blvncampuscare.com

High schools and secondary schools in Maharashtra
Private schools in Maharashtra
Wardha district
1995 establishments in Maharashtra
Educational institutions established in 1995